Ice River is the Olympic technical ski course in China, located in Yanqing District, part of National Alpine Ski Centre resort, opened in 2022. 

History 
On 7 February 2022, premiere event was held on this course with women's olympic giant slalom event. Swedish skier Sara Hector who is leading in the discipline this season, more than deserved took the gold medal. Competition didn't go so well for other two favorites, Mikaela Shiffrin who didn't not finish the first run, and Petra Vlhová who reached really average result at 8th place.

On 9 February 2022, the beat in the season and leading in the discipline Petra Vlhová, took gold medal at women's olympic slalom, the only missing title in her career. Mikaela Shiffrin again did not finish the 1st run.

Olympics

Women 

Downhill in women's Alpine combined event was held on "Rock" course.

Men 

Downhill in men's Alpine combined event was held on "Rock" course.

References

External links
 beijing2022.cn official

Sports venues completed in 2021
Venues of the 2022 Winter Olympics
2021 establishments in China
Alpine skiing at the 2022 Winter Olympics
2022
Ski areas and resorts in China